Tamara Francine Smith, an Australian politician, is a member of the New South Wales Legislative Assembly representing Ballina for the Greens since 2015. Smith is the first non-conservative to represent the Ballina area in 88 years.

Novelist Dominic Smith is her brother.

Political career
Smith won Ballina at the 2015 State election. She joined two other Greens, Jamie Parker and Jenny Leong (member for Newtown) in the lower house of the New South Wales Parliament.  She retained her seat, with a 2.26-point two-party swing in her favour, in the 2019 election.

Personal
Smith's family have lived in the Northern Rivers area for four generations. She has campaigned against the Howard government's WorkChoices scheme and coal seam gas.

References

Year of birth missing (living people)
Living people
Australian Greens members of the Parliament of New South Wales
Members of the New South Wales Legislative Assembly
Australian solicitors
Australian schoolteachers
University of New South Wales alumni
University of Sydney alumni
Southern Cross University alumni
21st-century Australian politicians
Women members of the New South Wales Legislative Assembly
21st-century Australian women politicians